Philipine van Aanholt (born 26 May 1992) is a female sailor from Curaçao, competing mainly in the Laser Radial class. She is a two-time Women World Champion in non-Olympic classes. In 2008 and 2009 she was chosen Curaçao's Youth Sports Women of the year. After the National Olympic Committee of the Netherlands Antilles lost its recognition by the International Olympic Committee following the dissolution of the Netherlands Antilles in 2010, van Aanholt was allowed to participate in the 2012 Summer Olympics as an Independent Olympic Athlete. In 2016, she represented neighboring island Aruba at the Summer Olympics in Rio de Janeiro. She was Aruba's flag bearer at the opening ceremony of the 2015 Pan American Games.

Sports Career 
Van Aanholt started sailing from an early age, in the Optimist. At the age of 12 she competed at her first World Championship in Ecuador. She moved on to the Splash, in this class she claimed her first World Championship title in 2008. The next year, she placed second in the Splash and earned her second World Championship title in the Sunfish.

From 2009 forward, she was mainly active in the Laser Radial class. In this class she competed in five world championships and two Olympic Games.

In 2011, she finished 5th in the Guadalajara Pan American Games and won the medal race.

At the age of 19 she qualified for the London 2012 Olympics, in which she competed as an Independent Olympic Athlete. She finished in 36th place out of 41 competitors overall, with a 16th place as her best result in race 7. 

Van Aanholt was a gold medalist at the Central American & Caribbean Games 2014 in Veracruz, Mexico. 

At the opening ceremony of the 2015 Pan American Games in Toronto, Van Aanholt was Aruba's flag bearer and finished 4th overall. 

In the Rio 2016 Olympics, she represented neighboring island Aruba and finished 28th out of 37 competitors overall. 

Van Aanholt serves as the athlete representative at the Executive Board of Panam Sailing (2019-2023).

Professional career 
Van Aanholt holds a bachelor’s degree in Business from the University of Groningen, a Master’s Degree in Environmental & Resource Management with a specialization in Energy from the Vrije Universiteit Amsterdam. She also has a Private Pilot License. 

In 2018, she started her professional career as an Analyst and Project Manager at a Private Equity firm. She moved on as investment specialist at sustainable crowdfunding platform OnePlanetCrowd and Impact fund manager StartGreen Capital. 

In 2021 Van Aanholt became Head of Sales and Business Development at AMDAX, the first company to receive a full Crypto Service Provider Registration from De Nederlandsche Bank (DNB).

Family 
Philipine is the daughter of sports scientist Marjolein van Aanholt Grol and Olympian and Sunfish World Champion Cor van Aanholt, who also was a member of the Board of the World Olympians Association and flag bearer at Sydney 2000. Cor van Aanholt participated in the 2000 Summer Olympics in the Laser class. 

Philipine's siblings are also competitive sailers, some of their accomplishments: Her brother Ard van Aanholt won a bronze medal in the Sunfish Class at the 2010 Central American and Caribbean Games in Mayagüez, Puerto Rico. Brother Just van Aanholt won silver at the 2010 Youth Olympics in Singapore. Sister Odile van Aanholt carried the flag of The Netherlands at the Opening Ceremony of the 2014 Youth Olympics in Nanjing, where she claimed a silver medal. In 2021 Odile van Aanholt became European Champion and World Champion in the 49erFX class.

References

External links
 Homepage
 

1992 births
Living people
Dutch Antillean female sailors (sport)
Aruban female sailors (sport)
Sailors at the 2012 Summer Olympics – Laser Radial
Curaçao sportswomen
Independent Olympic Athletes at the 2012 Summer Olympics
Sportspeople from Utrecht (city)
Pan American Games competitors for Aruba
Sailors at the 2015 Pan American Games
Sailors at the 2016 Summer Olympics – Laser Radial
Olympic sailors of Aruba
Sailors at the 2019 Pan American Games
Central American and Caribbean Games medalists for Aruba
Central American and Caribbean Games medalists in sailing
Competitors at the 2014 Central American and Caribbean Games